Thomas Desmond Rowe (7 January 1920 – 3 July 2003) was an Australian rules footballer who played with Hawthorn in the Victorian Football League (VFL).

After playing four games with Hawthorn in 1942, Rowe enlisted in the Australian Army and served for the remainder of World War II.

Notes

External links 

1920 births
2003 deaths
Australian rules footballers from Victoria (Australia)
Hawthorn Football Club players
Dandenong Football Club players